, also known as ATV, is a Japanese broadcast network affiliated with the Japan News Network. Their headquarters are located in Aomori Prefecture.

The broadcaster (alongside RAB) also air certain programs from Fuji TV as the prefecture doesn't have a FNN/FNS affiliate.

History
December 1, 1969 : It was set up as Aomori Prefecture's second broadcasting station.
July 1, 2006 : its Aomori main station started their first Digital terrestrial television broadcasts.
July 24, 2011 : All-analog TV stations were abolished.

Stations

Analog stations 
Aomori(Main Station) JOAI-TV 38ch 10kw
Tappi-Utetsu 38ch 0.1w
Hachinohe 33ch 1 kw
Kamikita 55ch 100w
Kinobe 55ch 1w
Ikokuma 55ch 3w
Owani 22ch 30w
Mutsu 58ch 100w
San'nohe-Nambu 42ch 10w
Kasose 42ch 10w
Tsugaru-Oguni 42ch 0.1w
Imabetsu 56ch 10w
Asamushi 56ch 0.5w
West-Towada 56ch 3w
Gonohe 56ch 10w

Digital stations(ID:6)
Aomori(Main Station) JOAI-DTV 30ch 1 kW

Programs
Syndicated from Fuji TV:
One Piece (Sunday Morning, 5:15)

Rival stations
Aomori Broadcasting Corporation(RAB)
Asahi Broadcasting Aomori(ABA)
Aomori FM Broadcasting(AFB)

Other Links
ATV Official Site

Japan News Network
Television stations in Japan
Television channels and stations established in 1969
Mass media in Aomori (city)